is a manga series written by Tomoko Hayakawa. The individual chapters have been serialized in Bessatsu Friend since 2000, and in 36 tankōbon volumes in Japan by Kodansha. The series was licensed for an English language release in North America by Del Rey Manga and in Singapore by Chuang Yi, under the name My Fair Lady. The series ended in January 2015 after 36 volumes.

Nippon Animation adapted part of the manga series into a twenty-five episode anime series which aired on TV Tokyo and TV Aichi from October 3, 2006 through March 27, 2007. The anime adaptation has been licensed for Region 1 release by A.D. Vision, who paid $500,000. In 2008, The WallFlower became one of over 30 ADV titles whose North American rights were transferred to Funimation Entertainment.

Plot

The Wallflower is about a girl named Sunako who was called ugly by the first and only person to whom she confessed her love. This incident sparks a life change, and as a result Sunako shuns all forms of beauty, both in herself as well as in life. Concerned by her change for the worse, Sunako's aunt, the owner of a huge mansion where four very handsome high school students live (for free), demands the boys to transform her niece into the "perfect lady", and in return they will be able to continue living there for free. They are given a deadline and if they are unable to uphold their deal then they would have to either pay a lump sum of cash or vacate the premises.

While the four of them manage to make Sunako physically beautiful enough to become a lady, the problem lies with her attitude and interests (which Sunako has no intention of changing). Up until the most recent release in the story, they manage to convince Sunako's aunt that her niece is indeed a lady befitting the mansion in which they live (and prevent the rent from skyrocketing to triple the required amount). However, in reality Sunako has not changed at all. Sunako has the tendency to spurt out in a nose bleed when seen by bright creatures, especially around Kyohei.

It is a humorous tale following Sunako and the four boys through unusual and ridiculous situations where Sunako is confronted with many unwanted experiences of being a lady, while also channeling the idea of self and beauty.

Media

Manga

The Wallflower manga series is written by Tomoko Hayakawa. The individual chapters have been serialized in Bessatsu Friend since its premiere in 2000, and in 36 tankōbon volumes in Japan by Kodansha. The series is licensed for an English language release in North America by Del Rey Manga and in Singapore by Chuang Yi – under the name My Fair Lady and in Indonesia by Level Comics under the name Perfect Girl Evolution.

Anime

Because the manga's creator, Tomoko Hayakawa, is an avid admirer of the rock singer, Kiyoharu, it was decided that Kiyoharu would perform the theme music for The Wallflower anime. His songs, "Slow" and "Carnation" play over the opening and ending themes, respectively. The songs were a collaboration between Kiyoharu and Takeshi Miyo. The background orchestral music was written by two respectable Japanese composers, Hiromi Mizutani and Yasuharu Takanashi.

The opening theme "Slow" plays over recycled footage from the first episode, and is more of a love ballad. Episode 14 onwards shows the second version of the opening sequence which portrays more original footages. Whether this change was made due to growing popularity or the initial reception is unknown.

The first closing theme, "Carnation", the more upbeat of the two, is set to a small computer animation of Hiroshi dancing in the corner as the credits scroll up the page. 

∞Changing∞, the second ending theme by Bon-Bon Blanco, presents the viewers with an even faster rhythm while preserving the use of computer animation (Hiroshi, Josephine and Akira dancing to the song) in the sequence.

Live action drama
In the 18th issue of Bessatsu Friend, it was announced that a live action drama adaption of the manga has been green-lit for airing in January 2009. On November 30, the cast was announced for the live action drama. Actor and member of the J-pop group KAT-TUN, Kazuya Kamenashi stars as Kyohei, while actress Aya Ōmasa plays the lead role as Sunako. This is broadcast on TBS with the opening theme, KAT-TUN's "Love Yourself (Kimi ga Kirai na Kimi ga Suki)". They added one more main character, Nakahara Takeru, the landlady's son.

Influence
The Wallflower has inspired a fashion line by Julie Haus that appeared in the 2008 New York Fashion Week.

References

Further reading

External links
 Official TV Tokyo The Wallflower anime website 
 Official TBS The Wallflower TV drama website 
  

 
2000 manga
ADV Films
Del Rey Manga
Kodansha manga
Funimation
Japanese television dramas based on manga
Nippon Animation
Shōjo manga
Kin'yō Dorama
TV Tokyo original programming
Television shows written by Eriko Shinozaki